Colin McIver (23 January 1881 – 13 May 1954) was an English cricketer. He played for Essex between 1902 and 1934.

Just after the Second World War, Colin McIver lived in Ashtead, Surrey. He was President of the local Ashtead Cricket Club.   McIver was a great friend of Sir Henry Dudley Gresham Leveson Gower, who was an English cricketer (from the Leveson-Gower family). He played first-class cricket for Oxford University, as did Colin McIver, and he also captained Surrey and England.

Colin McIver instituted the annual Leverson-Gower v Ashtead annual cricket event.

References

External links

1881 births
1954 deaths
English cricketers
Essex cricketers
Oxford University cricketers
Marylebone Cricket Club cricketers
Free Foresters cricketers
Gentlemen cricketers
Harlequins cricketers
Oxford and Cambridge Universities cricketers
Alumni of Hertford College, Oxford
H. D. G. Leveson Gower's XI cricketers
L. G. Robinson's XI cricketers